is a dormant volcano located in Shikotsu-Toya National Park in Hokkaidō, Japan. It sits adjacent to Mount Tarumae and opposite Mount Eniwa. Mount Fuppushi is on the south shore of Lake Shikotsu, the caldera lake that spawned the volcanoes.

See also
List of volcanoes in Japan

References

External links 
  - Japan Meteorological Agency
 Fuppushi Dake - Geological Survey of Japan
 Paul Hunt, Hiking in Japan: An Adventurer's Guide to the Mountain Trails, Tokyo, Kodansha International Ltd., 1988.  and 

Fuppushi
Fuppushi
Fuppushi
Shikotsu-Tōya National Park
Holocene stratovolcanoes